Mgr. Antonius Subianto Bunjamin, OSC (born 14 February 1968) is a Roman Catholic bishop and President of the Bishops' Conference of Indonesia.

Ordained to the priesthood in 1996, Bunjamin was named bishop of the Roman Catholic Diocese of Bandung, Indonesia in 2014 succeeding Johannes Pujasumarta.

The Vatican appointed Bunjamin as Apostolic Visitator to the Roman Catholic Diocese of Ruteng in 2017, and to the Archdiocese of Merauke in 2019.

Background
Bunjamin was born on 14 February 1968 in Bandung, West Java. When he was a child, he was nicknamed beke, a Sundanese word which means short, because compared to his friends, Bunyamin was short. He grew up in the Parish of Santa Odilia, Cicadas.

Notes

External links

1968 births
Living people
People from Bandung
Canons Regular of the Order of the Holy Cross
21st-century Roman Catholic bishops in Indonesia
Pontifical Lateran University alumni